Saddle Aces is a 1935 American Western film written and directed by Harry L. Fraser. The film stars Rex Bell, Ruth Mix, Buzz Barton, Stanley Blystone, Earl Dwire and John Elliott. The film was released on June 2, 1935, by Resolute Pictures Corp.

Plot

Cast           
Rex Bell as Steve Brandt
Ruth Mix as Jane Langton
Buzz Barton as Montana Nick Sabot
Stanley Blystone as Pete Sutton
Earl Dwire as Sloan / El Canejo
John Elliott as The Judge
Roger Williams as Bill 
Chuck Morrison as Deputy Sheriff
Chief Thundercloud as Canejo Rider Jose 
Mary MacLaren as Mrs. Sabot

References

External links
 

1935 films
1930s English-language films
American Western (genre) films
1935 Western (genre) films
Films directed by Harry L. Fraser
American black-and-white films
1930s American films